The Doublets are rock outcrops located centrally on the western side of David Island. The feature was discovered and named by the Western Base party of the Australasian Antarctic Expedition (1911–14) under Douglas Mawson.

References 

Rock formations of Queen Mary Land